Ashcombe House is a country house in St Ann Without, Lewes District in East Sussex. It is a Grade II* listed building.

It is co-owned with and faced by a once appurtenant (serving) Round House or Toll House, which is at Grade II, the lowest category of national listing. The L-shaped two-storey house with "grey headers with dressings, quoins and [a] modillion cornice of red brick" dates to the 18th century, when it served as a farmhouse. It was acquired by the University of Sussex in 1963 and was as its Vice-Chancellor's official residence until 1981.

References

Country houses in East Sussex
Grade II* listed houses
Grade II* listed buildings in East Sussex